Branko Milanović is a Serbian-American economist. He is most known for his work on income distribution and inequality. Since January 2014, he has been a visiting presidential professor at the Graduate Center of the City University of New York and an affiliated senior scholar at the Luxembourg Income Study (LIS). He also teaches at the London School of Economics and the Barcelona Institute for International Studies. In 2019, he has been appointed the honorary Maddison Chair at the University of Groningen. 

Milanović formerly was a lead economist in the World Bank's research department, visiting professor at University of Maryland and Johns Hopkins University. Between 2003 and 2005 he was senior associate at Carnegie Endowment for International Peace in Washington. He remained an adjunct scholar with the Endowment until early 2010. He did his Ph.D. at the University of Belgrade in 1987 on the dissertation on economic inequality in Yugoslavia, using for the first time micro data from Yugoslav household surveys. He published it as a book in 1990.

Scholarly work on inequality
He has published a large number of papers, including some 40 for the World Bank, mainly on world inequality and poverty. His 2005 book, Worlds Apart  covered global income disparity between countries as well as between all individuals in the world. His joint work with Jeffrey Williamson and Peter Lindert ("Economic Journal", March 2011), was considered by The Economist to "contain the germ of an important advance in thinking about inequality".

Milanovic is the author of 2011's The Haves and the Have-Nots, a book of essays on income distribution; The Globalist selected The Haves and the Have-Nots as number one on its "top books of 2011". Milanovic currently serves on the advisory board for Academics Stand Against Poverty (ASAP). In August 2013, he was included by Foreign Policy among the top 100 "twitterati" to follow. In November 2014, he became external fellow in Center for Global Development in Washington.

He has written the blog globalinequality since May 2014. His book Global inequality: A New Approach for the Age of Globalization was published in April 2016. The book (in its German translation) received the Bruno Kreisky Prize for the best political book of 2016, the 2018 Hans Matthöfer Prize for the best book in economics awarded by the Friedrich-Ebert-Stiftung and was included among 12 top books in business and economics published in 2016 by the Financial Times. He received, together with Mariana Mazzucato, the 2018 Leontief Prize for Advancing the Frontiers of Economic Thought.

His book Capitalism, Alone: The Future of the System that Rules the World was published in September 2019. It was included by Foreign Affairs  on the list of Best Books of 2020. In July 2020, the magazine Prospect included him among the top 50 thinkers in the year 2020.

He is widely known for his "elephant" curve that shows that those around the 70th–90th percentile in global income, roughly corresponding to lower earners in the developed world, have missed out on real income growth over the last 20 years.

Selected works

Books
 Liberalization and Entrepreneurship. Dynamics of Reform in Socialism and Capitalism, 1989. M.E. Sharpe.
 Income, Inequality, and Poverty during the Transition from Planned To Market Economy. 1998. World Bank. 
 (with Ethan Kapstein) Income and Influence. 2003. Upjohn Institute.
 (with Christiaan Grootaert and Jeanine Braithwaite) Poverty and Social Assistance in Transition Countries. 1999. St. Martin's Press.
 Worlds Apart. Measuring International and Global Inequality. 2005. Princeton/Oxford.
 The Haves and the Have-Nots: A Brief and Idiosyncratic History of Global Inequality, 2010, Basic Books, New York.
 Global inequality: A New Approach for the Age of Globalization, 2016, Harvard University Press.
 Capitalism, Alone: The Future of the System That Rules the World, 2019, Harvard University Press.

Articles
 (with Marco Ranaldi), “Capitalist systems and income inequality”, Journal of Comparative Economics, 2021
 (with Li Yang and Filip Novokmet), “From workers to capitalists in less than two generations: A study of Chinese urban elite transformation between 1988 and 2013”, British Journal of Sociology, vol. 72, No. 3, June 2021.
 “Towards an explanation of inequality in pre-modern societies: the role of colonies and high population density”,  The Economic History Review, vol. 71, No. 4, 2018.
 (with Christoph Lakner), “Global income distribution:  from the fall of the Berlin Wall to the Great Recession”, World Bank Economic Review, vol. 30, No. 2, pp.  203-232, July 2016. 
 (with Leif Wenar) “Are Liberal Peoples Peaceful?”, Journal of Political Philosophy,  Volume 17, Issue 4, 2009.
 Global inequality of opportunity:  how much of our income is determined by where we live”, Review of Economics and Statistics, vol. 97, No. 2 (May), 2015.
 (with Peter Lindert and Jeffrey Williamson), “Pre-industrial inequality”, Economic Journal, March 2011,
 “An estimate of average income and inequality in Byzantium around year 1000”, Review of Income and Wealth, vol. 52, No. 3, 2006.
 “Economic integration and income convergence: not such a strong link?”, Review of Economics and Statistics, vol. 88, No, 4, 2006.
 “Can We Discern the Effect of Globalization on Income Distribution? Evidence from Household Budget Surveys", World Bank Economic Review, No. 1, 2005.
 “The Two Faces of Globalization: Against Globalization as We Know it”, World Development, April 2003, pp. 667-683.
 (with Shlomo Yitzhaki),  "Decomposing World Income Distribution: Does the World Have a Middle Class?", Review of Income and Wealth, Vol. 48, No. 2, June 2002.
 “True World Income Distribution, 1988 and 1993: First Calculations Based on Household Surveys Alone”, Economic Journal, vol. 112, No. 476, January 2002.
 "Cash Transfers, Direct Taxes and Income Distribution in Late Socialism", Journal of Comparative Economics, No.2, 1994.
 "Remittances and Income Distribution", Journal of Economic Studies, No.5, 1987.
 "Patterns of Regional Growth in Yugoslavia, 1952 1983", Journal of Development Economics, vol. 25, 1987.
 "The Austrian Theory of the Labor Managed Firm", Journal of Comparative Economics, No.6, 1982.

References

External links
 CarnegieEndowment.org
 globalinequality blog 
 CUNY bio

Living people
World Bank people
21st-century American economists
Serbian economists
American people of Serbian descent
University of Belgrade alumni
University of Belgrade Faculty of Economics alumni
Graduate Center, CUNY faculty
1953 births
American bloggers
University of Maryland, College Park faculty
Center for Global Development
21st-century American non-fiction writers